Alexander Uzlyan (1908–198?) was a Russian photojournalist.

Life and work 
Alexander Uzlyan was born in Rostov-on-Don in 1908. He graduated from the Soviet Higher State Institute of Cinematography. In the 1930s he joined the staff of Komsomolskaya Pravda, the newspaper of the Young Communist League.

Uzylan went on to work as a photojournalist for various Russian news organizations, including Izvestiya, Pravda, Literaturnaya Gazeta, and Ogonyok.

During World War II he accompanied the Black Sea Fleet, documenting its activities for the Soviet Information Bureau. His photographic record of Soviet naval exploits during the war have been described as giving "an impression of movement that is almost like a motion picture."

In the mid 1970s he left the USSR ad took up residence in the United States.

His photographs are still being distributed through Sovfoto agency. His photograph (credited only to 'Sovfoto') of a father and son doing calisthenics indoors in their underwear was sourced by Wayne Miller for MoMA's world-touring 1955 exhibition The Family of Man curated by Edward Steichen.

References

Soviet photographers
Russian photojournalists
1908 births
1980s deaths